Anders Fjordbach (born 4 November 1990) is a Danish racing driver who currently competes in the FIA World Endurance Championship.

Career
Fjordbach began his senior racing career in 2007, competing in the Yokohama 1600 Challenge Denmark and the Volkswagen Polo Cup Denmark, finishing 11th and 10th in the championships respectively. The following year, Fjordbach returned to the Polo Cup, finishing 5th. In 2009, an accident at Oschersleben during ADAC Procar competition led him to postpone his racing career, making his return in 2012. After several years competing in national championships, Fjordbach signed a contract with High Class Racing in 2013 to compete in the Danish Thundersport Championship; a partnership that would later lead to appearances at the 24 Hours of Le Mans.

In 2015, Fjordbach won the Dubai 24 Hour in the 997 class, competing for Team Black Falcon. Two years later, Fjorbach claimed his second class victory at the event, also driving for Team Black Falcon in the equivalent Porsche Cup class. Later in 2015, Fjordbach began competing in the then-Blancpain Sprint Series, winning the Silver Cup class in his first event at Nogaro.

2017 marked the beginning of Fjordbach's career in prototypes, as he finished 9th in the LMP2 class of the European Le Mans Series. This experience led to a ride with Algarve Pro Racing during the 2018–19 Asian Le Mans Series season, with aims to win the P2 Am Trophy. One of Fjordbach's co-drivers on that team was Chris McMurry, father of American driver Matt McMurry, who competed for PR1 Mathiasen Motorsport in the WeatherTech SportsCar Championship. With the team short a driver, Fjordbach was called in for the 2019 12 Hours of Sebring. The team would finish second in class, 13 laps behind the leader.

2019 also presented Fjordbach with his first chance to compete at Le Mans, as High Class Racing were called in off the reserve list to compete in the LMP2 class. The team finished 16th overall, taking 11th place in class. In May of that year, Fjordbach tested the Ginetta G60-LT-P1 at Spa ahead of its re-introduction for the 2019–20 season.

For the 2021 season, Fjordbach had a double racing program with High Class Racing, competing in the World Endurance Championship and joining the team in their return to GT competition, as the team fielded an entry for himself and Mark Patterson in the new GT2 European Series. The duo claimed victory in the series' inaugural race at Monza in April. The following season, Fjordbach piloted the new Brabham BT63 GT2 for the High Class-backed Brabham Automotive Factory Racing team. Driving alongside Kevin Weeda, the team scored their first and only victory of the season at Misano.

Racing record

Career summary

* Season still in progress

Complete FIA World Endurance Championship results
(key) (Races in bold indicate pole position; races in italics indicate fastest lap)

GT2 European Series results - ProAm Class

Le Mans Cup results

European Le Mans Series results

IMSA Sportscar Championship results

Complete 24 Hours of Le Mans results

References

External links
Anders Fjordbach at Racing Reference

1990 births
Living people
Danish racing drivers
24 Hours of Daytona drivers
24 Hours of Le Mans drivers
FIA World Endurance Championship drivers
WeatherTech SportsCar Championship drivers
European Le Mans Series drivers
Blancpain Endurance Series drivers
Sportspeople from Aalborg
NASCAR drivers
24H Series drivers
Asian Le Mans Series drivers
Phoenix Racing drivers
ISR Racing drivers
Nürburgring 24 Hours drivers
Le Mans Cup drivers